Berlancourt is a commune in the Oise department in northern France

Population

See also
Communes of the Oise department

References

Communes of Oise